Averyanov (masculine) or Averyanova (feminine) is a Russian last name.

There are two theories regarding the origins of this last name. According to the first one, it is a form of the last name Averkiyev and derives from the Russian male first name Averky, one of the forms of which is "Averyan". However, it is also possible that this last name derives from "Averyan", a corruption of the name Valerian.

People with the last name
Aleksandr Averyanov (disambiguation), several people
Aleksei Averyanov (b. 1985), Russian association football player
Irina Averyanova, basketball player, squad member at the 2011 FIBA Asia Championship for Women
Lidiya Averyanova, Soviet rower participating in the Friendship Games
Lyubov Averyanova, Russian weightlifter, silver medalist in the Women 46 kg discounted event of a European Weightlifting Championship
Nikolay Averyanov (disambiguation), several people
Pavel Averyanov (b. 1984), Russian association football player
Pavel Averyanov (basketball), Turkmenistani basketball player participating in the 2012 FIBA Asia Champions Cup
Yevgeni Averyanov, Russian association football coach of FC Ural Sverdlovsk Oblast

Fictional characters
Averyanov, a character in the 1991 movie A Captive in the Land

Toponyms
Averyanov, alternative name of the rural locality (a settlement) of Averyanovka in Kologrivsky District of Kostroma Oblast, Russia;

See also
Averyanovka, several rural localities in Russia

References

Notes

Sources
Ю. А. Федосюк (Yu. A. Fedosyuk). "Русские фамилии: популярный этимологический словарь" (Russian Last Names: a Popular Etymological Dictionary). Москва, 2006. 



Russian-language surnames